Equestrian was first introduced to in the 1984 Summer Paralympics and consisted of 12 events, all of which were mixed.

Australia first started participating Equestrian in the 1996 Summer Paralympics

Medal Tally

Summer Paralympic Games

1996 Atlanta

Australia represented by: Women – Susan Haydon, Sharon Konemann, Sue Lee, Margaret Reynolds,  Mandy Waalwyk Coach - Mary Longden  ;  

Officials - Manager – – Sally Francis

2000 Sydney

Australia represented by:Women - Rosalie Fahey,  Sue Haydon,  Julie Higgins, Marita Hird, Judy Hogan, Sue-Ellen Lovett, Anne SkinnerCoaches - Carolyn Lieutenant (Head),  Gillian Rickard Officials - Judy Cubitt (Chef d'Equipe),  Dinah Barron 

Australia won 2 gold and 2 bronze medals in its second Paralympic competition. It came second to Great Britain  in the overall medal tally. Due to the team's results, Head Coach Carolyn Lieutenant won the Australian Coaching Council's Female Coach of the Year award.

2004 Athens

Australia represented by: Women – Georgia Bruce, Marita Hird, Jan Pike, Anne Skinner Coaches - Gillian Rickard (Head),  Anne Hall                                                                                                                                                                                    Officials - Manager – Sue Cusack, Judy Fyfe Jan Pike on her horse Dr Doolittle won a silver and bronze medal in dressage events.

Detailed Australian Results at the 2004 Paralympics - Individual and Team Competitions

2008 Beijing

Australia represented by: Women – Grace Bowman, Georgia Bruce, Sharon Jarvis, Nicole Kullen, Jan Pike  Coaches - Mary Longden (Head Coach),David Bowman, Sally Francis Officials –  Ken Dagley (Section Manager), Doug Denby, Nicola Reynoldson, Michelle Goodrick, Judy Fyfe, Margaret Keyes, Emma Bardot, Ebony Tucker, Terrina Fairbrother, Liz Wright-Smith, Chris Elliott, Carolyn Lieutenant.Australia won 2 bronze medals through Georgia Bruce's performances. The competition was held in Hong Kong.Detailed Australian Results at the 2008 Paralympics - Individual and Team Competitions

2012 London

Australia represented by: Women - Grace Bowman,  Hannah Dodd, Joann Formosa Men - Rob Oakley Head coach - Julia Battams Officials - Secrion Manager – Sally Francis, Physioptherapist – Victoria Kahn,  Veterinarian – Janine Dwyer, Grooms – Elsa Davis, Nicole King, Fay Mendez, Kate O'BrienThree athletes attended Games for the first time. Australia won its first gold medal since the 2000 Sydney Games with Joann Formosa's medal.

Detailed Australian Results at 2012 Paralympics - Individual and Team Competitions

2016 Rio 

Australia represented by: 

Women' - Emma Booth (d), Sharon Jarvis, Lisa Martin (d), Katie Umback (d) Head coach - Julia BattamsOfficials - Team Leader - Sally Francis, Physiotherapist - Victoria Kahn,  Veterinarian - Denis Goulding,  Grooms - Shahira Ameen, Emma Bardot, Sam Moran, Maddison McAndrew,  Carer - Raelene Booth  Detailed Australian Results at the 2016 Paralympics - Individual and Team Competitions

2020 Tokyo

Australia represented by: 
Women – Emma Booth (groom Shahira Ameen), Sharon Jarvis (groom Ashleigh Campton), Victoria Davies (groom Shae Herwig), Amelia White (groom Anke Wilming)                              Head coach - Lone Joergensen Officials - Team Leader - Stefanie Maraun, Sports Science & Medicine Manager – Alison Alcock, Veterinarian - Janine Dwyer, Carer (Emma Booth) - Raelene Booth  

Detailed Australian Results at 2020 Paralympics - Individual and Team Competitions

(d) Paralympic Games debut

References

 Australian Paralympic teams
Australia at the Paralympics
Equestrian sports in Australia